J16 may refer to:

Roads
 County Route J16 (California)
 Malaysia Federal Route J16

Vehicles 
 GSR Class J16, an Irish steam locomotive
 , a Sandhayak-class survey ship of the Indian Navy
 LNER Class J16, a British steam locomotive class
 Shenyang J-16, a Chinese strike fighter aircraft

Other uses
 Elongated pentagonal bipyramid, a Johnson solid (J16)
 Pneumonia
 J16, an orca, mother of Scarlet